Nikola Kovačević (12 December 1890, in Nudo, Nikšić, Principality of Montenegro – 24 August 1964, in Herceg Novi, SFR Yugoslavia) was a Montenegrin communist politician and revolutionary, member of Communist Party of Yugoslavia, one of the founders of Communist Party of Montenegro and Head of State and Parliament of SR Montenegro (from 1950 to 1953). He was brother of Sava Kovačević, People's Liberation Army commander and People's Hero of Yugoslavia.

He was a member of the Communist Party of Yugoslavia since 1920. From 6 November 1950 to 4 February 1953 he held the office of President of the Presidium of the National Assembly, and from 4 February to 19 December 1953 the office of President of the National Assembly of the People's Republic of Montenegro.

His great-granddaughter is Irena Vujović, a Serbian government minister.

References

Speakers of the Parliament of Montenegro
Presidents of Montenegro
Yugoslav communists
Montenegrin communists
Politicians from Nikšić